Yves Cros (5 October 1923 – 21 July 1995) was a French athlete who competed in the 1948 Summer Olympics.

Football 
Cros was the manager of French football club USM Malakoff from 1949 to 1969 and 1970 to 1979.

References

1923 births
1995 deaths
French male sprinters
French male hurdlers
Olympic athletes of France
Athletes (track and field) at the 1948 Summer Olympics
European Athletics Championships medalists
French football managers